Dedi Kusnandar or Dado (born 23 July 1991) is an Indonesian professional footballer who plays as a midfielder for Liga 1 club Persib Bandung.

Club career 
Dedi start his club career playing with Pelita Jaya FC in 2008, before moving to Arema Cronus F.C. in 2012. He then played with Persebaya ISL (Bhayangkara) for two years before moving to Persib Bandung in 2014. In 2016, he played in the Malaysian Premier League for Sabah FA before returned to Persib Bandung for the 2017 edition.

International career 
He made his international debut on 15 May 2014, in a 1–1 draw against Dominican Republic.

Career statistics

International

International goals 
Dedi Kusnandar: International under-23 goals

Honours

Club 
Persib U–18
 Soeratin Cup: 2006
Pelita Jaya U–21
 Indonesia Super League U-21: 2008–09; runner–up 2009–10
Arema Cronus
 Menpora Cup: 2013
Persib Bandung
 Indonesia President's Cup: 2015

International 
Indonesia U–23
 Southeast Asian Games  Silver medal: 2013
 Islamic Solidarity Games  Silver medal: 2013
Indonesia
 AFF Championship runner-up: 2016

Individual 
 Indonesia Super League U-21 Best Player: 2008–09

References

External links 
 
 

1991 births
Living people
Association football midfielders
Sundanese people
People from Sumedang
Indonesian footballers
Sportspeople from West Java
Liga 1 (Indonesia) players
Pelita Jaya FC players
Arema F.C. players
Bhayangkara F.C. players
Persib Bandung players
Footballers at the 2014 Asian Games
Indonesia youth international footballers
Indonesia international footballers
Indonesian expatriate footballers
Expatriate footballers in Malaysia
Indonesian expatriate sportspeople in Malaysia
Sabah F.C. (Malaysia) players
Malaysia Super League players
Southeast Asian Games silver medalists for Indonesia
Southeast Asian Games medalists in football
Competitors at the 2013 Southeast Asian Games
Asian Games competitors for Indonesia
21st-century Indonesian people